Témime Ben Abdallah (born 1 January 1949 in Hammam-Lif) commonly known as Témime Lahzami is a former Tunisian football winger.

He was the captain of Tunisia's 1978 World Cup campaign.

References

1949 births
Living people
Tunisian footballers
Tunisian expatriate footballers
Tunisia international footballers
Olympique de Marseille players
Ligue 1 players
Ittihad FC players
1978 FIFA World Cup players
1978 African Cup of Nations players
Competitors at the 1975 Mediterranean Games
Mediterranean Games bronze medalists for Tunisia
Expatriate footballers in France
Expatriate footballers in Saudi Arabia
Saudi Professional League players
Association football midfielders
Mediterranean Games medalists in football
Tunisian expatriate sportspeople in France
CS Hammam-Lif players
Espérance Sportive de Tunis players